Ghost Catchers is a 1944 American comedy horror film. Ole Olson and Chic Johnson are nightclub owners, helping their neighbors rid an old house of ghosts. Their club's headwaiter Jerry (Leo Carrillo) is really a gangster trying to scare off the tenants in the house so he can steal a stash of aged liquor from the basement.

Cast
Ole Olsen – Himself
Chic Johnson – Himself
Leo Carrillo – Jerry
Gloria Jean – Melinda Marshall
Martha O'Driscoll – Susanna Marshall
Andy Devine – Horsehead

Production
The film was known as High Spirits. Jean's casting was announced in February 1944.

See also
List of American films of 1944
Ghostbusters

References

External links
 
 
 
 

1944 films
1944 horror films
1940s ghost films
1940s comedy horror films
American black-and-white films
American comedy horror films
1944 comedy films
Films scored by Edward Ward (composer)
1940s English-language films
1940s American films